Yelena Flekontovna Shatkovskaya (born December 15, 1957, Arkhangelsk, RSFSR, USSR) is a Soviet and Russian scientist, the first and only director of the Kenozersky National Park of the Ministry of Natural Resources and Ecology of the Russian Federation since 1991, Honored Worker of Culture of the Russian Federation (2013), honorary citizen of the Arkhangelsk region (2018). In June 2019 Russia Day in a ceremony in the Grand Kremlin Palace she received the State Prize of the Russian Federation for the year 2018 for her contribution to the preservation of the historical, cultural and natural heritage of Russia.

References

State Prize of the Russian Federation laureates
Recipients of the Medal of the Order "For Merit to the Fatherland" II class
Russian ecologists
People from Arkhangelsk
1957 births
Living people